Vesijako (also Vesijakaa) is a lake in Finland. It is situated in Padasjoki in the region of Päijänne Tavastia.

The lake is famous in Finland as a bifurcation lake (the name Vesijako actually means "drainage divide"), together with the nearby Lummene that is somewhat less known, and from which waters flow eastwards into lake Päijänne and westwards through the lake Vehkajärvi into lake Vesijako.

Vesijako in its turn has also two outflows. One is eastwards to the lake Päijänne, which is a part of Kymijoki basin and drains to the Gulf of Finland. Other outflow is into a chain of lakes that is a part of the Kokemäenjoki basin and consists of the lakes Kuohijärvi, Kukkia, Iso-Roine, Hauhonselkä and Ilmoilanselkä and ends into lake Mallasvesi, from which the waters flow through Vanajavesi and Pyhäjärvi towards Kokemäenjoki in the west.

See also
List of lakes in Finland

References

External links
 Not Any Usual Route (About bifurcation lakes in Finland)

Kymi basin
Kokemäenjoki basin
Bifurcation lakes
Lakes of Padasjoki